The Shwesandaw Pagoda, or Shwesandaw Paya is a Buddhist pagoda in the center of Pyay, Burma. It is one of the more important Buddhist pilgrimage locations in Burma. It is said to contain a couple of the Lord Buddha's hairs, as its name means Golden Hair Relic.

References

Pagodas in Myanmar
Buddhist pilgrimage sites in Myanmar